A replica is a copy that is relatively indistinguishable from the original.

Replica may also refer to:

Science and technology
 Replica trick
 Replica (Microbiology), Complementary copy of single stranded DNA.
 Replica (Microtechnology), Complementary copy of a structure or pattern containing inverted detail.
 Replica (Plan 9), a client-server data replication system
 Replica 1, a clone of the Apple I computer
 BAE Replica, a BAE Systems aircraft research project
 T-Rex Replica, a digital delay guitar pedal made by T-Rex Engineering

Entertainment
 Replicas (film), a 2018 American science fiction thriller film
 Replica, comic book character from Guardians of the Galaxy (1969 team)
 "Replica" (The Outer Limits), TV series episode
 Replica Magazine, an online magazine and advocate of collective journalism
 Replica, a novel series by Marilyn Kaye

Music 
 Replicas (album), a 1979 album by Gary Numan and Tubeway Army
 Replica (Threshold album), 2004
 Replica (Oneohtrix Point Never album), 2011
 "Replica" (song), a 2014 song by Maaya Sakamoto
 "Replica", a song by Beck from Modern Guilt
 "Replica", a song by Fear Factory from the album Demanufacture
 "Replica", a song by Sonata Arctica from Ecliptica

See also
 Replica Replica, an album by Red Riders
 ReplicaNet, a freeware network program
 Replicant, a type of being in the film Blade Runner
 Replication (disambiguation)
 Replika, an online chatbot
 Replikas, a Turkish rock band